Ulf Lohmann is a German electronic music producer most popular for his releases on Kompakt. He has released an album, Because Before, and several singles. Much of his work has been featured on Kompakt's Pop Ambient series.

References
[ Because Before Allmusic entry]

External links

German electronic musicians
Living people
Year of birth missing (living people)
Place of birth missing (living people)
German male musicians